The 2007 Korean League Cup, also known as the 2007 Samsung Hauzen Cup, was the 20th competition of the Korean League Cup.

Group stage

Group A

Group B

Knockout stage

Top scorers

Awards

Source:

See also
2007 in South Korean football
2007 K League
2007 Korean FA Cup

References

External links

2007
2007
2007 domestic association football cups
2007 in South Korean football